Joseph H. Rogers Observatory  is an astronomical observatory owned and operated by Northwestern Michigan College.  It is located in Traverse City, Michigan (USA). Construction on the observatory was completed in 1981.

See also 
List of observatories

References

External links
Joseph H. Rogers Observatory Clear Sky Clock

Astronomical observatories in Michigan
Buildings and structures in Grand Traverse County, Michigan
University and college buildings completed in 1981
Northwestern Michigan College
Tourist attractions in Grand Traverse County, Michigan
1981 establishments in Michigan